The Saunders Lakeland Mountain Marathon (SLMM) is a two-day mountain marathon held in the English Lake District ('or its environs', such as the adjoining Howgill Fells) in early July. It was founded by David Meek, and sponsored by a long-time UK manufacturer of light-weight tents.

The SLMM has been held annually since 1978, apart from 2001, when the Lakeland fells were closed because of the Foot and Mouth crisis. 2018 will therefore be the 40th event.

It is usually considered to be less 'hair-shirt' than the slightly older OMM formerly Karrimor (OMM), since the weather is often mild, the courses slightly shorter, and the overnight camp is often found to be within walking distance of a pub. However, there have been notable exceptions to this - in 2004 (the 26th event, out of Coniston) consistently poor weather over two days forced many teams to retire. In 1997 (the 20th annual event, starting from Grasmere) courses were set which meant many teams were still out on the Sunday evening, long after the prize-giving was due to take place.

The event comprises 8 courses of which 6 are solely for pairs of runners, one is exclusively for solo competitors and one course is open for both pairs and solo entrants. The organisers encourage young competitors, with lower entry fees for Under 25s and there is a specific, handicapped class for parent and child (age 14+), Bedafell. In 2018 the event will include a Score class for the first time, called Fairfield.

The Backpackers Club has traditionally provided marshals for the event.  They assist at the registration and mid-way campsites and man the many checkpoints spread around the various routes.

Because of the popularity of the Lakes, courses are usually set to run 'across the grain' of the country, away from popular paths, so as to minimise erosion due to the race.

External links
SLMM website

Fell running competitions in Cumbria
Orienteering in the United Kingdom